T. I. Madhusoodanan  is an Indian politician serving as the MLA of Payyanur Constituency since May 2021.

References

Year of birth missing (living people)
Living people
Members of the Kerala Legislative Assembly
Communist Party of India (Marxist) politicians from Kerala